"Let the Music Play" is a song recorded by American singer Shannon and released on September 19, 1983 as both her debut single and the lead single from her 1984  debut studio album of the same name. Written by Chris Barbosa and Ed Chisolm, and produced by Barbosa and Mark Liggett, "Let the Music Play" was the first of Shannon's four number ones on the US Dance Club Songs chart, reaching the top spot in October 1983. It also became a huge crossover hit in the US, peaking at number two on the Hot R&B/Hip-Hop Songs chart (behind Patti LaBelle's "If Only You Knew") and number eight on the Billboard Hot 100 in February 1984. It was Shannon's only Top 40 hit in the US. Some mark "Let the Music Play" as the beginning of the "dance-pop" era.

"Let the Music Play" was ranked 43rd on the 2009 VH1 Special 100 Greatest One-Hit Wonders of the 1980s. The song also appears in the video games Dance Central 3 and Scarface: The World Is Yours.

Background and recording
The original version of the song was produced by Chris Barbosa and Mark Liggett. By the early 1980s, the backlash against disco had driven dance music off mainstream radio stations in the United States. The rhythmic ingenuity of "Let the Music Play" was largely due to Barbosa, who wrote and arranged the original demo track. Rob Kilgore played all the instruments on this seminal track. It featured a series of keyboard chords and drum patterns produced by gating a Roland TR-808 drum machine. Specifically, a reverb was placed across the kick and snare and hard gated to change the sounds. Further, it was one of the first tracks to sync together a TR-808 and a Roland TB-303 bassline, notorious in later years for the instrument responsible for creating acid house. The TB-303 plays the bassline for the entire song; however, in this case, the filter is not adjusted, which was typical for acid house music. This technical achievement made the production even more groundbreaking and it also resulted in a unique sound, called "The Shannon Sound", which eventually became known as freestyle.

Composition
"Let the Music Play" is a dance-pop and freestyle song with synthesizer and drum machine-produced rim shot percussion sounds and kick-drum/snare-drum interaction. Critic and journalist Peter Shapiro described the song as a "cross between Gary Numan and Tito Puente." The song's tempo is 116 beats per minute.

Music video
The accompanying music video for "Let the Music Play", directed by British director Nigel Dick and released in November 1983, starts with Shannon in a dressing room applying make-up as if she is getting ready for a performance. She then proceeds to the stage of an empty theater where she proceeds to dance and sing the song. Interspersed throughout these scenes are shots of male and female dancers fashioned in dress shirts and bow ties warming up. The dancers join Shannon by the second chorus of the song and near the end, one of the dancers proceeds to take her in his arms and dance with her. The video ends with the dancers doing a choreographed routine while Shannon continues singing.

Impact and legacy
American DJ, record producer, remixer and songwriter Armand van Helden picked "Let the Music Play" as one of his "classic cuts" in 1995, adding, "A very powerful record. The first strong vocals over electro music. The first big hit that I can remember that struck me and paved the way for freestyle. Back then it was hip hop, but not considered rap."

VH1 ranked the song number 24 in their list of the 100 Greatest Dance Songs in 2000. 

Blender ranked it number 465 in their list of The 500 Greatest Songs Since You Were Born in 2005.

Slant Magazine ranked it number 54 in its 100 Greatest Dance Songs list in 2006, adding, "Alongside Madonna's 'Holiday,' D.C.-born jazz vocalist Brenda Shannon Greene's 'Let the Music Play' helped redefine dance music in the anti-disco early-'80s, setting the stage for the troubled genre for the next decade. Producers Mark Liggett and Chris Barbosa, considered one of the founding fathers of Latin freestyle, merged the then-hip electro-funk sound with Latin rhythms, unwittingly creating the world's first freestyle song."

VH1 ranked the song number 42 in their 100 Greatest One-Hit Wonders of the 1980s in 2009.

ThoughtCo ranked it number nine in their list of 25 Best Dance Pop Songs of All Time in 2018.

Slant Magazine ranked it number nine in their ranking of The 100 Best Dance Songs of All Time in 2020.

Rolling Stone ranked "Let the Music Play" number six in their list of 200 Greatest Dance Songs of All Time in 2022.

Charts

Weekly charts

Year-end charts

Certifications

Mary Kiani version

In 1996, Mary Kiani covered "Let the Music Play" as her third solo single. The song was remixed in a variety of styles, notably by Paul Oakenfold of Perfecto and Steve Rodway of Motiv8. A video of the song was also released.

Track listings and formats
These are the main formats and track listings of the single release of Mary Kiani's "Let the Music Play."

Cover versions
In 1987, Icelandic punk band Mosi frændi released a cover of the song on their 13-track cassette-only release, "Suzy Creamcheese for president".
In 1991, freestyle artist Tiana did a cover of this song.
The soundtrack of Neil Jordan's The Crying Game, released in 1992, includes a cover by Carroll Thompson, produced by Pet Shop Boys.
In 1996, Scottish singer Mary Kiani covered the song and hit the #19 spot on the UK singles chart. (See below.)
A cover version by Music Instructor was included on its album Electric City of Music Instructor, released in 1998.
Exile, a Japanese boy band, did a cover of this song on their album, titled Asia, released in 2006.
In 2006, Mexican pop band RBD covered "Let the Music Play," which is featured on its first English-language album, Rebels, but only as an iTunes digital-download exclusive. The track was not included on the album itself.
"S.O.S. (Let the Music Play)," the second single from the 2009 album Battlefield by Jordin Sparks, contains lyrics and melodies from the song.
In 2006, "Let The Music Play" was also recorded by Sisaundra Lewis from NBC's The Voice.
House DJ/producer Secondcity sampled the lyrics on his track "Let The Music."

References

Songs about music
1983 debut singles
1996 singles
Shannon (singer) songs
Mary Kiani songs
Songs written by Chris Barbosa
Song recordings produced by Chris Barbosa
Music videos directed by Nigel Dick
Mirage Records singles
Atco Records singles
Atlantic Records singles
Mercury Records singles
1983 songs